The Afghan Alphabet (Alefbay-e afghan) is a 2002 documentary by Mohsen Makhmalbaf showing the life of children in the Afghan villages bordering Iran, and how their life and culture were affected by the Taliban regime.

Importance
In 2002 about 3 million Afghan refugees were living in Iran. From those about 700,000 were Afghan children who were not allowed to go to Iranian schools because of their illegal status in Iran. After this movie was made, this subject became controversial and finally the Islamic Consultative Assembly passed a bill to allow Afghani children to go to school and it resulted in 500,000 kids getting education.

Awards & Festival Screenings

Best Film Award from Document ART International Film Festival, (Germany) 2002
Fajr International Film Festival, Iran 2002
Gotteburg 2003
Rio 2003
Busan International Film Festival 2003
Hong Kong 2003
Greece	6 March 2002	 (Thessaloniki Documentary Festival)
USA	6 April 2002	 (DoubleTake Documentary Film Festival)
USA	2 June 2002	 (Seattle International Film Festival)
Canada	1 September 2002	 (Montreal World Film Festival)
Japan	7 September 2002	 (Tokyo)
USA	4 October 2002	 (Chicago International Film Festival)
South Korea	18 November 2002	 (Pusan International Film Festival)
Singapore	3 May 2003	 (Singapore International Film Festival)
Hungary	4 October 2006	 (TV premiere)

References

External links

Iranian documentary films
Films directed by Mohsen Makhmalbaf
Documentary films about children
Documentary films about Afghanistan